Obdulio Barthe (Encarnación; September 5, 1903 – Buenos Aires; 1981) was a Paraguayan Communist and syndicalist politician. In 1931, he was one of the leaders in the Encarnación Commune.

See also 
Anarchism in Paraguay

Bibliography 
 Antonio Bonzi:  Historical process of the Paraguayan Communist Party (An itinerary of lights and shadows) , Arandura Editorial, Asunción 2001.

Further reading 

 

1903 births
1981 deaths
Paraguayan people of French descent
History of Paraguay
Paraguayan communists
Paraguayan anarchists